Shen Dao (c. 350c. 275BC) was a Chinese philosopher and writer. He was a "Chinese Legalist" theoretician most remembered for his influence on Han Fei with regards to the concept of shi 勢 (circumstantial advantage, power, or authority), though most of his book concerns the concept of fa 法 (administrative methods & standards) more commonly shared among "Legalists". Compared with western schools, Shen Dao considered laws that are not good "still preferable to having no laws at all."

Making use of the term dao 道 without cosmological or metaphysical reference, the Shenzi serves as noteworthy precursor to both Daoism and Han Fei. Posthumously, he is also sometimes classified as Taoist, and Wang Fuzhi speculated that the chapter "Essay on Seeing Things as Equal" of the Zhuangzhi was actually written by Shen Dao. Compared with the egoist Yang Chu, Shen Dao is characterized by the Zhuangzhi as impartial and lacking selfishness, his great way embracing all things.

Usually referred to as "Master Shen" ("Shenzi" 慎子) for his writings, very little is known of Shen Dao's life.  An itinerant Chinese philosopher from Zhao, he was probably born about 350BC, travelling to the city of Linzi (modern Zibo, Shandong) in 300BC to become a member of the Jixia Academy. Shen probably left Linzi after its capture by the state of Yan in 285BC, possibly moving to the Han kingdom and absorbing the "Legalist" tradition there. He died roughly 10 years later.

Text
Thompson states that the Shenzi was available until the fall of the Tang dynasty, though not in its original edition. Shen Dao's own original 42 essays have been lost. With only 7 fragments still extant, he is known largely through short references and the writings of others, notably the Han Feizi and Zhuangzi. A critical reconstruction of the lost book of Shenzi was made by Paul Thompson, and published in 1979 as The Shen Tzu Fragments. In 2007, the Shanghai Museum published a collection of texts written on bamboo slips from the State of Chu dating to the Warring States period, including six bamboo slips with sayings of Shenzi. These are the only known examples of the text of Shenzi that are contemporaneous with its composition.

Xun Kuang considered Shen's style grandiose.

Statecraft

Shen Dao espouses an impersonal administration in much the same sense as "Legalist" Shen Buhai, and in contrast with "Legalist" Shang Yang emphasizes the use of talent and the promotion of ministers, saying that order and chaos are "not the product of one man's efforts." He also argued for Wu wei, or the non action of the ruler, along the same lines as Shen Buhai, saying

However he challenges the Confucian and Mohist esteem and appointment of worthies as a basis of order, pointing out that talented ministers existed in every age. Taking it upon himself to attempt a new, analytical solution, Shen advocated fairness as a new virtue.  Scholar Sugamoto Hirotsugu attributes the concept of Fen, or social resources, later used by the Guanzi and Xunzi, to Shen, given a "dimensional" difference through Fa (measurement, standards, protocol, administrative method), social relationships ("yin") and division. Shen Dao eschews appointment by interview in favour of a mechanical distribution ("the basis of fairness") with the invariable Fa apportioning every person according to their achievement. 

The greatest function of Fa ("the principle of objective judgement") is the prevention of selfish deeds and argument. However, doubting its long-term viability Shen did not exclude moral values and accepted (qualified) Confucian Li's supplementation of Fa and social relationships, though he frames Li in terms of (impersonal) rules. 

For this reason he is said to "laugh at men of worth" and "reject sages", his order relying not on them but on the Fa.

Linking Fa to the notion of impartial objectivity associated with universal interest, and reframing the language of the old ritual order to fit a universal, imperial and highly bureaucratized state, Shen cautions the ruler against relying on his own personal judgment, contrasting personal opinions with the merit of the objective standard, or fa, as preventing personal judgements or opinions from being exercised. Personal opinions destroy Fa, and Shen Dao's ruler therefore "does not show favoritism toward a single person."

Doctrine of Position (Shih)

Generally speaking, "Chinese Legalism" understood that the power of the state resides in social and political institutions, and are innovative in their aim to subject the state to them. Like Shen Buhai, Shen Dao largely focused on statecraft (Fa), and Confucian Xun Kuang discusses him in this capacity, never referencing Shen Dao in relation to power. Shen Dao is remembered for his theories on Shih (lit. "situational advantage", but also "power" or "charisma") because Han Fei references him in this capacity. 

Han Fei says: 

Used in many areas of Chinese thought, Shih probably originated in the military field. Diplomats relied on concepts of situational advantage and opportunity, as well as secrecy (shu) long before the ascendency of such concepts as sovereignty or law, and were used by kings wishing to free themselves from the aristocrats. Sunzi (Art of War) would go on to incorporate Taoist philosophy of inaction and impartiality, and Legalist punishment and rewards as systematic measures of organization, recalling Han Fei's concepts of power (shih) and tactics (shu).

On the Shih of the Sunzi, relatable to Shen Dao's, Henry Kissinger says: "Chinese statesmanship exhibits a tendency to view the entire strategic landscape as part of a single whole... Strategy and statecraft become means of 'combative coexistence' with opponents. The goal is to maneuver them into weakness while building up one's own shi, or strategic position." Kissinger considers the "maneuvering" approach an ideal, but one that ran in contrast to the conflicts of the Qin dynasty.

Shen Dao
Searching out the causes of disorder, Shen Dao observed splits in the ruler's authority. Shen Dao's theory on power echoes Shen Buhai, referenced by Xun Kuang as its originator, who says "He who (can become) singular decision-maker can become the sovereign of All under Heaven". Shen Dao's theory may otherwise have been borrowed from the Book of Lord Shang. 

For Shen Dao, "Power" (Shih) refers to the ability to compel compliance; it requires no support from the subjects, though it does not preclude this. (Shih's) merit is that it prevents people from fighting each other; political authority is justified and essential on this basis. Shen Dao says: "When All under Heaven lacks the single esteemed [person], then there is no way to carry out the principles [of orderly government, li 理].... Hence the Son of Heaven is established for the sake of All under Heaven... All under Heaven is not established for the sake of the Son of Heaven..."

Talent cannot be displayed without power. Shen Dao says: "The flying dragon rides on the clouds and the rising serpent wanders in the mists. But when the clouds disperse and the mists clear up, the dragon and the serpent become the same as the earthworm and the large winged black ant because they have lost what they ride." Leadership is not a function of ability or merit, but is given by some a process, such as giving a leader to a group. "The ruler of a state is enthroned for the sake of the state; the state is not established for the sake of the prince. Officials are installed for the sake of their offices; offices are not established for the sake of officials...

Usually disregarded by the Fa-Jia, Shen Dao considers moral capability useful in terms of authority. If the ruler is inferior but his command is practised, it is because he is able to get support from people. But his ideas otherwise constitute a "direct challenge" to Confucian Virtue. Virtue is unreliable because people have different capacities. Both morality together with intellectual capability are insufficient to rule, while position of authority is enough to attain influence and subdue the worthy, making virtue "not worth going after."

Notes

References

Further reading
 The Shenzi Fragments: A Philosophical Analysis and Translation translated by Eirik Lang Harris, 2016, Columbia University Press

External links
 Shen Dao: Text and Translation
 Hong Kong University Philosophy Department, Shen Dao
 Surviving text of the Shenzi
 慎到
 慎到與《慎子》考
 

350s BC births
270s BC deaths
4th-century BC Chinese philosophers
3rd-century BC Chinese philosophers
Legalism (Chinese philosophy)
People from North China
Zhou dynasty philosophers